Surgeons of Hope (SOH) is a New York City-based nonprofit organization established in 2001. It deals with heart defects in children and the related surgery.

Background 

Surgeons of Hope began its work with pilot programs in Cambodia, Mozambique, Senegal, and Afghanistan. In 2008, it shifted focus to efforts in Latin America.  In 2013, Surgeons of Hope opened the only pediatric heart center in Nicaragua. As of 2018, Surgeons of Hope has programs in Nicaragua and Costa Rica.

References

Organizations established in 2002
Organizations based in New York City
Health charities in the United States
Health in Central America
Heart disease organizations
Medical and health organizations based in New York (state)